The 1998 Hall of Fame Tennis Championships (also known as 1998 Miller Lite Hall of Fame Championships for sponsorship reasons) was a men's tennis tournament played on grass courts at the International Tennis Hall of Fame in Newport, Rhode Island in the United States and was part of the World Series of the 1998 ATP Tour. It was the 23rd edition of the tournament and was held from July 6 through July 12, 1998. Unseeded Leander Paes won the singles title.

Finals

Singles

 Leander Paes defeated  Neville Godwin 6–3, 6–2
 It was Paes' only singles title of his career.

Doubles

 Doug Flach /  Sandon Stolle defeated  Scott Draper /  Jason Stoltenberg 6–2, 4–6, 7–6

References

External links
 Official website
 ATP tournament profile
 ITF tournament edition details

 
Hall of Fame Tennis Championships
Hall of Fame Tennis Championships
Hall of Fame Tennis Championships
Hall of Fame Tennis Championships
Hall of Fame Open